Until 1 January 2007 Hørning municipality was a municipality (Danish, kommune) in Aarhus County on the Jutland peninsula in central Denmark.  The municipality covered an area of 67.71 km², and had a total population of 8,688 (2005). Its last mayor was Søren Erik Pedersen, a member of the Venstre (Liberal Party)  political party. The main town and the site of its municipal council was the town of Hørning.  

Hørning municipality ceased to exist as the result of Kommunalreformen ("The Municipality Reform" of 2007).  It was merged with existing Galten, Ry, and Skanderborg municipalities to form the new Skanderborg municipality.  This created a municipality with an area of 416 km² and a total population of 49,469 (2005).  The new municipality belongs to  Region Midtjylland ("Mid-Jutland Region").

External links

References 
 Municipal statistics: NetBorger Kommunefakta, delivered from KMD aka Kommunedata (Municipal Data)
 Municipal mergers and neighbors: Eniro new municipalities map

Former municipalities of Denmark